Radical 199 or radical wheat meaning "wheat" is one of the 6 Kangxi radicals (214 radicals in total) composed of 11 strokes.

In the Kangxi Dictionary, there are 131 characters (out of 49,030) to be found under this radical.

Evolution

Derived characters

Literature

External links

Unihan Database - U+9EA5

199
149